Search for a Star is a Philippine television singing talent show broadcast by GMA Network. Hosted by Regine Velasquez, it premiered on June 21, 2003. The show concluded on March 13, 2004 with a total of 39 episodes. It was replaced by StarStruck Kids in its timeslot.

The grand finals happened in Ultra in Pasig on March 13, 2004. Rachelle Ann Go emerged as the winner out of ten grand finalists.

Grand finalists

 Rachelle Ann Go (winner)
 Raymond Manalo
 Tina Braganza
 Jerrianne Mae Templo
 Iris Malazarte
 Sarah Jean Badana
 Romelo Valeña
 Cheryl Sweet Ubasa
 Maria Camille Rellevo
 Genevieve Villabroza

References

External links
 

2003 Philippine television series debuts
2004 Philippine television series endings
Filipino-language television shows
GMA Network original programming
Philippine reality television series
Television series by Viva Television